Alfred Thompson (pseudonym: Thompson E. Jones, 7 October 1831 – 31 August 1895) was a British musical theatre librettist, set designer, costume designer, theatre manager, journalist and artist, contributing to Punch and Vanity Fair (signed "Ἀτη").

Biography
Thompson was born in London. He was educated at Rugby and Brighton. He matriculated at Trinity College, Cambridge, in 1850 and graduated B.A. in 1855. He served as a cavalry officer in the 6th Dragoons from 1855 until he sold his commission in 1857; he started as cornet and rose to captain. In 1854 he sold his first drawing to Diogenes and in 1856–1858 sold numerous drawings to Punch. He studied art in Munich with private lessons from Karl von Piloty and in Paris under Thomas Couture. In 1867 at the behest of Arthur à Beckett, Thompson joined the literary staff of The Tomahawk.

From February to December 1868, Thompson and Leopold David Lewis edited a monthly review The Mask, which failed. In the 1860s Thompson became successful as a librettist, set designer and costume designer for the British musical theatre in London. For the English stage he designed over five thousand costumes. During the 1870s in Manchester he was managing director of the Theatre Royal and the Prince's Theatre. In May 1883 as a journalist he represented the Daily News at the coronation of Tsar Alexader III. In the latter part of his career Thompson moved to Manhattan and became successful as a librettist for New York City musicals similar to those he had worked on in London and Manchester.

Libretti

Gallery from Vanity Fair

See also
Pepita; or, the Girl with the Glass Eyes
Vanity Fair caricatures

References

External links

National Portrait Gallery – Person – Alfred Thompson (Atn)
The log of the Water Lily, illustrated by Alfred Thompson — Hathi Trust Digital Library
Fellows 1800 – 99 – Queens College Cambridge Thomas Perronet Thompson was Alfred's uncle.

1831 births
1895 deaths
Alumni of Trinity College, Cambridge
American musical theatre librettists
British caricaturists
British costume designers
English musical theatre librettists
People educated at Brighton College
People educated at Rugby School
Punch (magazine) cartoonists
Vanity Fair (British magazine) artists
Writers from London
19th-century American dramatists and playwrights